Liu Shaoqi (24 November 189812 November 1969) was a Chinese revolutionary, politician, and theorist. He was Chairman of the NPC Standing Committee from 1954 to 1959, First Vice Chairman of the Chinese Communist Party from 1956 to 1966 and Chairman of the People's Republic of China, the de jure head of state, from 1959 to 1968, during which he implemented policies of economic reconstruction in China. 

For 15 years, Liu held high positions in Chinese leadership, behind only Chairman Mao Zedong and Premier Zhou Enlai. Originally considered as a successor to Mao, Liu antagonized him in the early 1960s before the Cultural Revolution. From 1966 onward, Liu was criticized and then purged by Mao. In 1968, Liu disappeared from public life and was labelled the "commander of China's bourgeoisie headquarters", China's foremost "capitalist-roader", and a traitor to the revolution. He was purged and imprisoned during the Cultural Revolution, but was posthumously rehabilitated by Deng Xiaoping's government in 1980 and granted a national memorial service.

Biography

Youth

Liu was born into a moderately rich peasant family in Huaminglou, Ningxiang, Hunan province; his ancestral hometown is located at Jishui County, Jiangxi. He attended Ningxiang Zhusheng Middle School, and was recommended to attend a class in Shanghai to prepare for studying in Russia. In 1920, he and Ren Bishi joined a Socialist Youth Corps; the next year, Liu was recruited to study at the Comintern's University of the Toilers of the East in Moscow.

He joined the newly formed Chinese Communist Party (CCP) in 1921. The next year he returned to China and, as secretary of the All-China Labor Syndicate, led several railway workers' strikes in the Yangzi Valley and at Anyuan on the Jiangxi-Hunan border.

Early political activities
In 1925, Liu became a member of the Guangzhou-based All-China Federation of Labor Executive Committee. During the next two years he led numerous political campaigns and strikes in Hubei and Shanghai. He worked with Li Lisan in Shanghai in 1925, organizing Communist activity following the May Thirtieth Incident. After his work in Shanghai, Liu traveled to Wuhan. He was briefly arrested in Changsha and then returned to Guangzhou to help organize the 16-month-long Canton-Hong Kong strike.

He was elected to the Party's Central Committee in 1927 and was appointed to the head of its Labor Department. Liu returned to work at the Party headquarters in Shanghai in 1929 and was named Secretary of the Manchurian Party Committee in Fengtian. In 1930 and 1931 he attended the Third and Fourth Plenums of the Sixth Central Committee, and was elected to the Central Executive Committee (i.e., Politburo) of the Chinese Soviet Republic in 1931 or 1932. Later in 1932, he left Shanghai and traveled to the Jiangxi Soviet.

Senior leader

Liu became the Party Secretary of Fujian Province in 1932. He accompanied the Long March in 1934 at least as far as the crucial Zunyi Conference, but was then sent to the so-called "White Areas" (areas controlled by the Kuomintang) to reorganize underground activities in northern China, centered around Beijing and Tianjin. He became Party Secretary in North China in 1936, leading the anti-Japanese movements in that area with the assistance of Peng Zhen, An Ziwen, Bo Yibo, Ke Qingshi, Liu Lantao, and Yao Yilin. Liu ran the Central Plains Bureau in 1939; and, in 1941, the Central China Bureau. Some Japanese sources have alleged that the activities of his organization sparked the Marco Polo Bridge Incident in July 1937, which gave Japan the excuse to launch the Second Sino-Japanese War.

In 1937, Liu traveled to the Communist base at Yan'an; in 1941, he became a political commissar of the New Fourth Army. He was elected as one of five CCP Secretaries at the Seventh National Party Congress in 1945. After that Congress, he became the supreme leader of all Communist forces in Manchuria and northern China, a role frequently overlooked by historians.

Liu became the Vice Chairman of the Central People's Government in 1949. In 1954 China adopted a new constitution at the first National People's Congress (NPC); at the Congress's first session, he was elected chairman of the Congress's Standing Committee, a position he held until the second NPC in 1959. From 1956 until his downfall in 1966, he ranked as the First Vice Chairman of the Chinese Communist Party.

Liu's work focused on party organizational and theoretical affairs. He was an orthodox Soviet-style Communist and favored state planning and the development of heavy industry. He elaborated upon his political and economic beliefs in his writings. His best known works include How to be a Good Communist (1939), On the Party (1945), and Internationalism and Nationalism (1952).

State Chairman
Liu spoke very strongly in favour of the Great Leap Forward at the Eighth CCP National Congress in May 1958. At this Congress Liu stood together with Deng Xiaoping and Peng Zhen in support of Mao's policies against those who were more critical, such as Chen Yun and Zhou Enlai.

As a result, Liu gained influence within the party. In April 1959, he succeeded Mao as Chairman of the People's Republic of China (Chinese President). However, Liu began to voice concern about the outcomes of the Great Leap in the August 1959 Lushan Plenum. In order to correct the mistakes of the Great Leap Forward, Liu and Deng led economic reforms that bolstered their prestige among the party apparatus and the national populace. The economic policies of Deng and Liu were notable for being more moderate than Mao's radical ideas.

Conflict with Mao

Liu was publicly acknowledged as Mao's chosen successor in 1961; however, by 1962 his opposition to Mao's policies had led Mao to mistrust him. After Mao succeeded in restoring his prestige during the 1960s, Liu's eventual downfall became "inevitable". Liu's position as the second-most powerful leader of the CCP contributed to Mao's rivalry with him at least as much as Liu's political beliefs or factional allegiances in the 1960s, especially during and after the Seven Thousand Cadres Conference, indicating that Liu's later persecution was the result of a power struggle that went beyond the goals and well-being of either China or the Party.

By 1966, few senior leaders in China questioned the need for a widespread reform to combat the growing problems of corruption and bureaucratisation within the Party and the government. With the goal of reforming the government to be more efficient and true to the Communist ideal, Liu himself chaired the enlarged Politburo meeting that officially began the Cultural Revolution. However, Liu and his political allies quickly lost control of the Cultural Revolution soon after it was called, when Mao used the movement to progressively monopolize political power and to destroy his perceived enemies.

Whatever its other causes, the Cultural Revolution, declared in 1966, was overtly pro-Maoist, and gave Mao the power and influence to purge the Party of his political enemies at the highest levels of government. Along with closing China's schools and universities, and Mao's exhortations to young Chinese to randomly destroy old buildings, temples, and art, and to attack their teachers, school administrators, party leaders, and parents, the Cultural Revolution also increased Mao's prestige so much that entire villages adopted the practice of offering prayers to Mao before every meal.

In both national politics and Chinese popular culture, Mao established himself as a demigod accountable to no one, purging any that he suspected of opposing him and directing the masses and Red Guards "to destroy virtually all state and party institutions". After the Cultural Revolution was announced, most of the most senior members of the CCP who had voiced any hesitation in following Mao's direction, including Liu Shaoqi and Deng Xiaoping, were removed from their posts almost immediately and, with their families, subjected to mass criticism and humiliation.

Liu and Deng, along with many others, were denounced as "capitalist roaders". Liu was labeled as a "traitor" and "the biggest capitalist roader in the Party"; he was displaced as Party Deputy Chairman by Lin Biao in July 1966. By 1967, Liu and his wife Wang Guangmei were placed under house arrest in Beijing. Liu's major economic positions were attacked, including his "three freedoms and one guarantee" (which promoted private land plots, free markets, independent accounting for small enterprises, and household output quotas) and "four freedoms" (which permitted individuals in the countryside to lease land, lend money, hire wage laborers, and engage in trade). 

Liu was removed from all his positions and expelled from the Party in October 1968. After his arrest, Liu disappeared from public view.

Vilification, death and rehabilitation

At the Ninth Party Congress, Liu was denounced as a traitor and an enemy agent. Zhou Enlai read the Party verdict that Liu was "a criminal traitor, enemy agent and scab in the service of the imperialists, modern revisionists and the Kuomintang reactionaries". Liu's conditions did not improve after he was denounced in the Congress, and he died soon afterward.

In a memoir written by Liu's principal physician, he disputed the alleged medical maltreatment of Liu during his last days. According to Dr. Gu Qihua, there was a dedicated medical team in charge of treating Liu's illness; between July 1968 and October 1969, Liu had seven total occurrences of pneumonia due to his deteriorating immune system, and there had been a total of 40 group consultations by top medical professionals regarding the treatment of this disease. Liu was closely monitored on a daily basis by a medical team, and they made the best effort given the adverse circumstances. He died in prison from complications due to diabetes at 6:45 a.m. on 12 November 1969 under a pseudonym in Kaifeng, and was cremated the next day.

In February 1980, two years after Deng Xiaoping came to power, the Fifth Plenum of the 11th Central Committee of the Chinese Communist Party issued the "Resolution on the Rehabilitation of Comrade Liu Shaoqi". The resolution fully rehabilitated Liu, declaring his ouster to be unjust and removing the labels of "renegade, traitor and scab" that had been attached to him at the time of his death. It also declared him to be "a great Marxist and proletarian revolutionary" and recognized him as one of the principal leaders of the Party. Lin Biao was blamed for "concocting false evidence" against Liu, and for working with the Gang of Four to subject him to "political frame-up and physical persecution". A high-profile national memorial ceremony was held for Liu on 17 May 1980, and his ashes were scattered into the sea at Qingdao in accordance with his last wishes.

On 23 November 2018, the CCP's general secretary Xi Jinping delivered a speech in the Great Hall of the People in Beijing to commemorate the 120th anniversary of the birth of Liu Shaoqi.

Personal life

Liu married five times, including to He Baozhen and Wang Guangmei.
His third wife, Xie Fei, came from Wenchang, Hainan and was one of the few women on the 1934 Long March.
His wife at the time of his death in 1969, Wang Guangmei, was thrown into prison by Mao Zedong during the Cultural Revolution; she was subjected to harsh conditions in solitary confinement for more than a decade.

His son Liu Yunbin (Chinese: 刘允斌; pinyin: Liú Yǔnbīn) was a prominent physicist who was also singled out for abuse during the Cultural Revolution. He committed suicide in 1967 by lying on the tracks before an oncoming train. Liu Yunbin was posthumously rehabilitated and his reputation restored in 1978.

Works

See also

 History of the People's Republic of China
 Liu Shaoqi's Former Residence

References

Citations

Sources 

 "Fifth Plenary Session of 11th C.C.P. Central Committee", Beijing Review, No. 10 (10 March 1980), pp. 3–10, which describes the official rehabilitation measures.

External links
 The Liu Shaoqi Reference Archive
The Theory of Transition in China: The Thought of Liu Shaoqi by Raymond Yeap

|-

|-

|-

|-

 
Presidents of the People's Republic of China
1898 births
1969 deaths
 
20th-century Chinese heads of government
Burials at sea
Chairmen of the Standing Committee of the National People's Congress
Chinese Communist Party politicians from Hunan
Chinese nationalists
Chinese people of World War II
Communist University of the Toilers of the East alumni
Delegates to the 5th National Congress of the Chinese Communist Party
Heads of government who were later imprisoned
Members of the 7th Politburo of the Chinese Communist Party
Members of the 8th Politburo Standing Committee of the Chinese Communist Party
People from Ningxiang
People of the Cultural Revolution
People persecuted to death during the Cultural Revolution
People's Republic of China politicians from Hunan
Politicians from Changsha
Secretaries of the Central Commission for Discipline Inspection
Spouses of Chinese politicians
Vice presidents of the People's Republic of China